Juan Legaz (born 27 March 1987) is a Spanish former competitive figure skater. He is the 2005 Spanish national champion and placed as high as 15th at the World Junior Championships.

Programs

Competitive highlights

References

External links 
 
 Juan Legaz at Tracings.net

1987 births
Spanish male single skaters
Living people
Sportspeople from Córdoba, Argentina
Spanish people of Argentine descent